St Matthias School is a mixed secondary school located in Wolverhampton in the West Midlands of England.

It was established as Deansfield High School in 1968, and serves the Deansfield area in the east of the city, around the Willenhall Road. It was later renamed Deansfield Community School.

Deansfield Community School relocated to new buildings in 2015 and was renamed St Matthias School.

References

External links

Secondary schools in Wolverhampton
Educational institutions established in 1968
1968 establishments in England
Community schools in Wolverhampton